Severo Aguilar Gabriel (born 11 March 1975) is a Bolivian politician and trade unionist who served as a member of the Chamber of Deputies from Potosí, representing circumscription 41 from 2010 to 2015. A member of the Movement for Socialism, he previously served as a member of the Constituent Assembly from Potosí, representing the same circumscription from 2006 to 2007. An ethnic Quechua, Aguilar was a prominent peasant leader in the Chayanta Province and was executive secretary of the Colquechaca Sectional Center throughout the early 2000s.

Early life and career 
An ethnic Quechua, Severo Aguilar was born on 11 March 1975 to Crisóstomo Aguilar and Felipa Gabriel, a peasant family native to Futina, a minor hamlet situated in northern Potosí's Chayanta Province, one of the poorest and most isolated regions in the country. Aguilar spent his childhood in rural poverty, working in agriculture and animal husbandry. Orphaned at around age thirteen, Aguilar relocated to Pocoata, briefly attending the local primary school before moving to Llallagua, where he completed secondary education and fulfilled his term of mandatory military service. Shortly after graduating, Aguilar traveled to Argentina, where he spent a year harvesting the tobacco and tomato crop, later settling in Santa Cruz for some time.

Returning to Potosí in 2001, Aguilar dedicated himself to promoting civic engagement in his community, pushing for greater allocation of resources in favor of public works and other infrastructure projects. From there, Aguilar quickly rose as a prominent local peasant leader. In January 2002, he was appointed as executive secretary of the Colquechaca Sectional Center, assuming the demands of the entire municipality's peasant movement. During the 2003 gas conflict, Aguilar led mobilizations against the government of Gonzalo Sánchez de Lozada, rejecting the sale of natural gas to Chile and calling for the convocation of a constituent assembly to reform the Constitution, two demands that proved successful in the ensuing years.

Political career 
In 2006, in representation of the Unified Syndical Center of Indigenous Workers and Ayllus of the Chayanta Province, Aguilar was postulated for a seat in the newly-formed Constituent Assembly. Together with Irma Mamani, the pair was comfortably elected to represent circumscription 41 on behalf of the Movement for Socialism. For Aguilar, whose rural community lacked public transport services, the trek to Constituent Assembly's headquarters in Sucre required a four-hour hike through the foothills before a truck finally took him the rest of the way. As a member of the Constituent Assembly's Autonomies Commission, Aguilar pushed for the implementation of a broad system of indigenous self-government, including State recognition of indigenous customary law and control over natural resources situated in indigenous lands.

Throughout the Constituent Assembly's existence, prolonged procedural stalemate and limited debate made it difficult for most constituents to project a national image, leading few to continue political careers following its closure. Aguilar was among the roughly one-tenth who did, with party bases in his home region nominating him to seek a seat in the Chamber of Deputies following the conclusion of his term as a constituent. In the 2009 general election, he was once again presented in circumscription 41 and was elected by one of the largest margins of the entire election cycle, attaining nearly ninety percent of the popular vote. As a deputy, Aguilar sought to coordinate his work with municipal administrations in order to directly meet their needs. He promoted the allocation of public resources in favor of agriculture, the expansion of rural education, and the construction of infrastructure aimed at combating the consequences of climate change.

Electoral history

References

Footnotes

Bibliography

External links 
 Constituent profile Constituent Assembly . Archived from the original on 30 October 2007.
 Deputies profile Vice Presidency .

1975 births
Living people
21st-century Bolivian politicians
Bolivian people of Quechua descent
Bolivian politicians of indigenous peoples descent
Bolivian trade union leaders
Members of the Bolivian Chamber of Deputies from Potosí
Members of the Bolivian Constituent Assembly
Movement for Socialism (Bolivia) politicians
People from Chayanta Province
Quechua politicians